The Robert Llewellyn Wright House is a historic home located at 7927 Deepwell Drive in Bethesda, Maryland.  It is an 1800-square foot two-story concrete-block structure designed by architect Frank Lloyd Wright in 1953, and constructed in 1957 for his sixth child, Robert Llewellyn Wright (1903–86), who worked at the Justice Department.

The Usonian house was designed using intersecting and concentric segments of a circle, or "hemicycles". Initial designs were scrapped after the construction was too costly.

The house can be seen from Deepwell Drive on a sloping lot that overlooks a stream.  It is also visible from the Cabin John Stream Valley Trail, which follows the Cabin John Creek below it.  In 1960, the grounds were landscaped by Lloyd Wright, brother of the client, and the son of the architect.

As of 2010, the house was inhabited by Tom Wright, grandson of Frank Lloyd Wright, and a volcano specialist.

It is one of only two Wright-designed structures in Maryland; the other is the Joseph Euchtman House in Baltimore County.

See also
 List of Frank Lloyd Wright works
 National Register of Historic Places listings in Montgomery County, Maryland

References

 Storrer, William Allin. The Frank Lloyd Wright Companion. University Of Chicago Press, 2006,  (S.358)

External links
 , Maryland Historical Trust

Houses completed in 1957
Buildings and structures in Bethesda, Maryland
Frank Lloyd Wright buildings
Houses on the National Register of Historic Places in Maryland
Houses in Montgomery County, Maryland
National Register of Historic Places in Montgomery County, Maryland